”Nothris” mesophracta is a moth of the family Gelechiidae. It is found in Australia (Victoria, Tasmania).

The wingspan is about 24 mm. The forewings are whitish with a few fuscous scales mostly on the veins and a broad median dark-fuscous streak from the base to the apex, and prolonged through the cilia. The hindwings are whitish-grey.

Taxonomy
The species was previously placed in Xerometra, now a synonym of Mesophleps, but research concluded it does not belong in this genus, nor the subfamily Anacampsinae. It is thought to belong to the subfamily Anomologinae, but it has not been placed in a genus yet.

References

Moths described in 1919
Chelariini